The epispiral is a plane curve with polar equation 
.
There are n sections if n is odd and 2n if n is even.

It is the polar or circle inversion of the rose curve.

In astronomy the epispiral is related to the equations that explain planets' orbits.

See also
Logarithmic spiral
Rose (mathematics)

References
 
 https://www.mathcurve.com/courbes2d.gb/epi/epi.shtml

Plane curves